Annette Potempa (born 18 September 1976) is a German gymnast. She competed in six events at the 1992 Summer Olympics.

References

1976 births
Living people
German female artistic gymnasts
Olympic gymnasts of Germany
Gymnasts at the 1992 Summer Olympics
Sportspeople from Chorzów